Chamaemyia hungarica is a species of fly in the family Chamaemyiidae. It is only found in Hungary.

References

Chamaemyiidae
Insects described in 1991
Muscomorph flies of Europe